Miami Pop Festival may refer to:

Miami Pop Festival (May 1968)
Miami Pop Festival (December 1968)
Miami Pop Festival (album), an album by the Jimi Hendrix Experience